Alexandria Stadium is a multi-purpose stadium in the Moharram Bey district of Alexandria, Egypt. It was built in 1929 by King Fouad I. Alexandria stadium now has a capacity of 13,660 after the remodeling and renovations in 2016–2017.

The stadium hosts the Al-Ittihad football team and has been the scene of international tournaments, including the inaugural of the 1951 Mediterranean Games. It was a venue for the 1986 African Cup of Nations and the 2006 African Cup of Nations editions, and hosted the Group B matches during the 2019 African Cup of Nations.

Architecture 
The stadium was designed by Russian architect Vladimir Nicohosov, who was influenced by Islamic architecture.

2019 Africa Cup of Nations
The stadium was one of the venues for the 2019  Africa Cup of Nations. The following games were played at the stadium:

Gallery

References

External links
 Alexandria Stadium

See also
 Borg El Arab Stadium
 Haras El Hodoud Stadium
 Sports in Alexandria

Football venues in Egypt
Multi-purpose stadiums in Egypt
Sports venues in Alexandria
Sports venues completed in 1929
1929 establishments in Egypt
2019 Africa Cup of Nations stadiums